The Toulon Tournament (officially the Festival International "Espoirs" – Tournoi Maurice Revello) is a football (training match) tournament, which traditionally features invited national teams composed of youth players from U-17 to U-23 level. The tournament is named after Maurice Revello, who started the tournament in 1967 and died in 2016. Although the first tournament in 1967 featured club teams, it has been limited to national teams since 1975 (except in 1986 and 1989 when INF Vichy was invited). The tournament is held around Provence-Alpes-Côte d'Azur, with the final usually being held in Toulon.

History
Toulon Tournament is a (training match) tournament not run under the supervision of FIFA or an individual national association. Therefore, it is deemed as the most prestigious of all friendly tournaments involving youth teams, and considered an unofficial world championship before FIFA introduced the official World Youth Cup in 1977. Despite the establishment of the FIFA U-20 World Cup and later, FIFA U-17 World Cup however, the Toulon Tournament remains an important (training match) tournament for youth football teams.

Rules
The Toulon Tournament usually was played with two 40-minute halves. In 2019 every match consisted of two periods of 45 minutes each. In a match, every team has eleven named substitutes and the maximum number of substitutions permitted is four.

In the knockout stage, if a game tied at the end of regulation time, extra time is not played and the penalty shoot-out is used to determine the winner.

Results

Stastistics

Performance by country

Performance by confederation

Awards

See also
 Sud Ladies Cup
 Torneo di Viareggio
 Granatkin Memorial
 Valeriy Lobanovskyi Memorial Tournament
 Under-20 Four Nations Tournament
 Under 20 Elite League
 Torneo delle Nazioni
 International Kuban Spring Women U-19 Tournament

Notes

References

External links
Official site
RSSSF

 
International association football competitions hosted by France
Under-21 association football
Sport in Toulon
Sport in Var (department)